The United States of America (USA) was the host nation for the 1932 Winter Olympics in Lake Placid, New York.

Medalists 

The following U.S. competitors won medals at the games. In the by discipline sections below, medalists' names are bolded. 

| width="78%" align="left" valign="top" |

| width=22% align=left valign=top |

Bobsleigh

Cross-country skiing

Figure skating

Men

Women

Mixed

Ice hockey

Summary

Roster

Tournament

Nordic combined 

The cross-country skiing part of this event was combined with the 18 km race of cross-country skiing. Those results can be found above in this article in the cross-country skiing section. Some athletes (but not all) entered in both the cross-country skiing and Nordic combined event, their time on the 18 km was used for both events.

The ski jumping (normal hill) event was held separate from the main medal event of ski jumping, results can be found in the table below.

Ski jumping

Speed skating

References

 Olympic Winter Games 1932, full results by sports-reference.com

Nations at the 1932 Winter Olympics
1932
Olympics, Winter